The Collegium Witkowski (Witkowski College), in Kraków, Poland, is a Jagiellonian University building erected in 1908–11. It stands at ulica Gołębia (Dove Street) 13 and was named for physicist and Jagiellonian University rector August Witkowski. 

The building's style mixes elements of Gothic-revival, Romanesque-revival and Art Nouveau architecture.

Originally used by the physics department, it now serves the history department.

References

Jagiellonian University buildings
Art Nouveau architecture in Poland
Art Nouveau educational buildings
Buildings and structures completed in 1911